Yevgeny Aleksandrovich Rodionov (23 May 1977 – 23 May 1996) was a Russian soldier who was taken prisoner of war by Chechen rebels in the First Chechen War and later executed in captivity. He has gained much admiration throughout Russia for the circumstances of his death, as his execution allegedly resulted from his refusal to convert to Islam and defect to the enemy side. Despite widespread popular veneration he has not been glorified by the Russian Orthodox Church as a New Martyr due to lack of evidence about his death.  Still, icons depicting him are installed in many churches across Russia, in St. Valery church in Chișinău, in a church of Kharkiv Polytechnic Institute in Ukraine, and in the Greek Orthodox Church of St. George in Frankfurt in Germany.

Early life 
Yevgeny Rodionov was born on 23 May 1977 in the village of Chibirley, Kuznetsky District, Penza Oblast, to Lyubov Vasiliyevna and Aleksandr Konstantinovich Rodionov. His father was a carpenter and furniture maker, who died a week after his son's death. His mother had a degree in furniture technologies.

In 1978, he was baptized as a Russian Orthodox at the age of one year, but wore no pectoral cross until the first one was given to him in 1988 or 1989, while attending church together with his grandmother. His mother disapproved, but Yevgeny never removed the cross; later he began wearing it with a small string instead of the original chain. After finishing ninth grade at a rural school of Kurilovo in Moscow Oblast, he began to work at a furniture factory and trained to be a driver.

Military service and capture 

Though Rodionov aspired to be a cook, he was conscripted into the Armed Forces of the Russian Federation on 25 June 1995. His training took place in 2631 Military Unit of Russian Border Troops in Ozersk, Kaliningrad Oblast. On 10 July 1995, he took the military oath. Rodionov was deployed to Chechnya, where he served in the Russian army's border troops as an RPG operator at the 3rd border outpost of the 3rd Motorised Manoeuvre Group of the 479th Border Troops Special Operations Unit (No. 3807).

On 13 January 1996, Rodionov was deployed to the Caucasus Special Border District, serving in the Nazran Border Unit (No. 2094). A month later, on 14 February 1996, accompanied by privates Andrey Trusov, Igor Yakovlev, and Alexander Zheleznov, he went to mount guard over a road. During their duty, they stopped an ambulance car transporting weapons and driven by Chechen Republic of Ichkeria brigade general Ruslan Khaikhoroev. During their attempt to examine the ambulance, all four soldiers were overpowered by a dozen Chechen rebels and taken prisoner. Initially, the soldiers were announced as deserters, and military police came to Rodionov's mother's home to search for her missing son. Only after the detailed survey of the checkpoint did military police discover traces of blood and evidence of fighting; the three missing soldiers then were declared missed in action and possible prisoners of war. Rodionov's mother, Lybov, went to Chechnya, but Rodionov's unit commander told her only that her son had been captured. Shamil Basayev promised to help Lybov to find her son. Only after paying a large sum of money did Lybov find the corpse of her son.

It was revealed that on 23 May 1996, on Rodionov's 19th birthday, after more than a hundred days of torture, Rodionov and two other soldiers were offered renunciation of their Christian faith and conversion to Islam in order to save their lives. Rodionov refused to convert to Islam and even to remove the silver cross he wore. After that decision, he was beheaded on the outskirts of the Chechen village of Bamut by Chechen rebels. Ruslan Khaikhoroev, the murderer, accompanied by an OSCE representative, later admitted the killing, saying to Rodionov's mother, "Your son had a choice to stay alive. He could have converted to Islam, but he did not agree to take the cross off. He also tried to escape once." Andrey Trusov was beheaded; Igor Yakovlev and Alexander Zheleznov were shot dead.

Rodionov's cross was given to St. Nicholas Church in Pyzhy. His body was buried in Moscow, at the Ascension Church near Satino-Russkoye village.

Veneration

Yevgeny Rodionov was posthumously awarded the Russian Order of Courage. There was a growing movement within the Russian Orthodox Church to canonize him as a Christian saint and martyr for faith. Some Russian soldiers, feeling themselves abandoned by their government, have taken to kneeling in prayer before his image. One such prayer reads:

Thy martyr, Yevgeny, O Lord, in his sufferings hath received an incorruptible crown from Thee, our God, for having Thy strength he hath brought down his torturers, hath defeated the powerless insolence of demons. Through his prayers, save our souls.

, religious icons depicting Rodionov had become popular. His mother has one herself; she has suggested that the icon of her son sometimes emits a perfume which she believes to be holy, to the extent that it actually drips with it.

Because of the popular devotion given to the New Martyr Rodionov, the pious faithful sought official canonization from the Moscow Patriarchate. Initially, it refused, which divided the Orthodox Church in Russia. Maksim Maksimov, Secretary of the Canonization Commission, explained the Synod's position in Tserkovny Vestnik (Church Bulletin), the official publication of the Russian Orthodox Church. His arguments can be summarized in three points:
The only evidence that the soldier was executed for this faith is the testimony of his mother, who in her love made a god of her son;
The Russian Orthodox Church has never canonized anyone killed in war;
The period of new martyrs ended with the collapse of the Bolshevik regime.

However, he emphasized that the deceased can be honoured without canonization. Patriarch Alexy II of Moscow personally blessed the popular account of Rodionov's life but worried that his cult would balloon into anti-Muslim rage.

Opponents of the decision, including Alexander Shargunov, a well-known priest, argued that an outbreak of people's love is enough for the truth and that Rodionov's grave works miracles, curing the sick and reconciling enemies. They also pointed out that the soldier did not die at war but in captivity and that to say that the time of martyrs is over is nearly heresy.

References

External links
"Boy soldier who died for faith made 'saint'", The Daily Telegraph, January 24, 2004
"A Drive to Turn a Soldier Into a Saint", The Moscow Times, October 19, 2004

"From Village Boy to Soldier, Martyr and, Many Say, Saint", The New York Times, November 21, 2003
"The First Saint of the Chechen War", RIAN, October 5, 2004

1977 births
1996 deaths
Christians executed for refusing to convert to Islam
Islamism-related beheadings
Executed Russian people
Folk saints
People from Penza Oblast
People of the Chechen wars
Persecution by Muslims
Prisoner of war massacres
Recipients of the Order of Courage
Russian military personnel
Russian Orthodox Christians from Russia
Russian prisoners of war
20th-century Eastern Orthodox martyrs